Srbice is a municipality and village in Domažlice District in the Plzeň Region of the Czech Republic. It has about 400 inhabitants.

Administrative parts
Villages and hamlets of Háje, Strýčkovice and Těšovice are administrative parts of Srbice.

References

Villages in Domažlice District